Giovanni "John the Eagle" Riggi (February 1, 1925 – August 3, 2015) was a New Jersey mobster and member of the DeCavalcante crime family since the 1940s, before the family had acquired its name. Riggi was the leader of the "Elizabeth crew" in the family when he was a Caporegime. He had been the acting boss during the 1970s and became the official boss around 1982. Riggi was incarcerated at the Federal Medical Center (FMC) Devens, Massachusetts, on extortion and labor racketeering convictions. He was released on November 27, 2012.

Early career
John Riggi had been a business agent of the "International Association of Laborers and Hod Carriers", in New Jersey for years. He was promoted to the position of official boss of the DeCavalcante crime family (a crime family within the criminal world of "Cosa Nostra") with close ties to the Five Families of New York and represented at meetings of The Commission by the Genovese crime family, Riggi reaped the enormous benefits of large labor and construction racketeering, loansharking, illegal gambling activities as well as a large legitimate income. Riggi also had the family maintain their old traditions. Riggi established a close friendship with new Gambino crime family boss, John Gotti. It was thought that Riggi still ran the family from prison despite being very sick.

His release date was in late 2012, but he was due to stand trial for ordering the shooting and murder of Staten Island, New York, resident Fred Weiss, a former journalist for the Staten Island Advance newspaper and real-estate developer in September 1989.

The murder was allegedly a favor for John Gotti, who was worried that Weiss was a government informant and that this would put the Gambino and DeCavalcante families at high risk. Weiss and two mob partners had purchased a vacant property in Staten Island and started illegally dumping large amounts of dangerous medical waste there. When local authorities uncovered the scheme and started investigating Weiss, the two mob families became nervous. Gotti, who worried that Weiss might become a government witness in exchange for leniency requested that the Decavalcantes murder Weiss to protect them. On September 11, 1989, Vincent Palermo and Anthony Capo, as well as a crew of twelve other DeCavalcante associates in a convoy of four vehicles, drove to the New York condominium of Weiss' girlfriend. As Weiss left the building and climbed into his car, Palermo and Capo got out of their vehicle, approached Weiss and murdered him by shooting him in the face multiple times. Both of them would become "made men" as a result of this.

Leading from jail
In 1990, Riggi was indicted on state and federal extortion and labor charges, pleading guilty in 1992 and sentenced to 12 years in prison at Butner in North Carolina. While in jail, Riggi appointed a ruling panel to take control of the DeCavalcante crime family until his release, but the acting boss of the panel, Gaetano "Corky" Vastola was arrested and jailed as well. John D'Amato was then appointed as acting boss. D'Amato's reign was short, as it soon became clear that he had been recruited by the Gambino crime family and had been conspiring to murder Vastola. Later in 1991, D'Amato came into an argument with his girlfriend, who was also involved with Anthony Rotondo. She told Rotondo that when she and D'Amato were out at clubs during the evenings, D'Amato would be swinging and have sex with other men. Reportedly, Rotondo became quite upset that someone within the family was taking part in homosexual acts and shared it with the current administration members Giacomo Amari, the reputed underboss, and Stefano Vitabile, the powerful consigliere, who decided to have D'Amato murdered after informing the incarcerated Riggi. In January 1992, D'Amato was reported missing; his body has never been found. Vincent Palermo, Anthony Capo and Anthony Rotondo would later testify about this murder against their former associates. In September 2003, Riggi was sentenced to an additional 10 years in prison after pleading guilty to ordering the 1989 murder of Weiss. In 2006, Philip Abramo, Giuseppe Schifilliti and Stefano Vitabile were sentenced to life imprisonment for their involvement in the murder. Riggi was released from the Federal Medical Center, Devens on November 27, 2012.

Death 
After his release, Riggi lived in a small house in Edison, New Jersey, with his nurse/doctor.  He died there on August 3, 2015, at the age of 90.

References

Notes

Smith, Greg B. Made Men: The True Rise-and-Fall Story of a New Jersey Mob Family. Berkley Books, 2003. 
Jacobs, James B. Busting the Mob: The United States Vs. Cosa Nostra. New York: NYU Press, 1994. 
Jacobs, James B., Coleen Friel and Robert Radick. Gotham Unbound: How New York City Was Liberated from the Grip of Organized Crime. New York: NYU Press, 1999. 
Goldstock, Ronald, Martin Marcus and II Thacher. Corruption and Racketeering in the New York City Construction Industry: Final Report of the *New York State Organized Crime Task Force. New York: NYU Press, 1990. 
United States. Congress. Senate. Committee on the Judiciary. Organized Crime in America: Hearings Before the Committee on the Judiciary, *United States Senate. Washington, D.C.: U.S. G.P.O., 1983.

1925 births
2015 deaths
Gangsters from Newark, New Jersey
American gangsters of Italian descent

American crime bosses